The Young Black Stallion is a 2003 made-for-IMAX family film from Walt Disney Pictures. Directed by Simon Wincer, the film is based on the 1989 novel of the same name by Black Stallion creator Walter Farley and his son Steven Farley. Noted for its beautiful scenery and wide-angle shots, the 50-minute film was shot on-location in the deserts of Namibia and South Africa. The film stars Biana G. Tamimi as Neera, a young girl who befriends a young black stallion, and Patrick Elyas as Aden, although his voice was dubbed by Eric Grucza, who, for his uncredited performance was nominated in 2004 for a Young Artist Award for Best Performance in a Voice-Over Role.

The film is Disney’s first production made specifically for IMAX theaters, and a prequel to the 1979 film The Black Stallion, which won an Academy Award and received nominations. The film was originally scheduled for release in fall 2002, then was postponed until September 2003, before debuting in select IMAX theaters in the United States on December 25, 2003.

Plot
The film follows the adventures of Shetan, a young black Arabian colt. After a band of robbers separates a young Arabian girl named Neera (Biana G. Tamini) from her father, she finds herself alone in the desert. Before too long, a mysterious black colt comes to her rescue. The two quickly form a special bond, and the horse returns Neera to her grandfather. Once Neera is back home, the stallion disappears.

Neera greets her grandfather Ben Ishak (Richard Romanus) and her cousin Aden (Patrick Elyas) eagerly, but is disappointed and upset when she find out that her grandfather's horse breeding days are over. Ben Ishak informs Neera that because of the shootings in the desert, his fields are ruined, and he can no longer afford to keep any of his horses. He kept an old plow-horse, Abha, and set his most precious mare Jinah free. We find out later that Jinah was Shetan's mother.

A year passes, but the black stallion does not return. Neera’s grandfather tells her that the horse was probably nothing more than a product of her imagination. But Neera knows better. She thinks the stallion is the lost horse of the desert, a legend born of the sands and sired by the night sky. Then, one night, the colt appears again. In an attempt to help her grandfather start a breeding farm again, Neera joins a grueling cross-country race against the finest horses of Arabia for a purse of the most exceptional Arabian mares. Shetan, the black stallion, is trained, and Neera rides him in the competition to restore her grandfather's money and respect. In the end, Neera wins, and Shetan is reunited with his mother.

Cast
 Richard Romanus as Ben Ishak 
 Biana G. Tamimi as Neera
 Patrick Elyas as Aden 
 Gérard Rudolf as Rhamon 
 Ali Al Ameri as Mansoor 
 Andries Rossouw as Kadir

Critical reception
Critical reception was mixed. Gene Seymour of Newsday commented: "The new giant screen contribution to the stallion's legend is a 45-minute story, which, at best, plays as if it could have barely passed muster as an installment of the old 1960s Disney TV series, The Wonderful World of Color". Megan Lehmann of the New York Post wrote that the film, as a visual treat, is diminished by lifeless dialogue and self-conscious acting.

External links 
  
 
 
 
 
 

2003 films
2000s English-language films
American drama films
Films about horses
Films directed by Simon Wincer
Films produced by Frank Marshall
Films set in the 20th century
Films set in 1946
Films set in 1947
Films set in deserts
Films scored by William Ross
Films shot in Namibia
Films shot in South Africa
IMAX short films
The Kennedy/Marshall Company films
Walt Disney Pictures films
2000s American films